The 1969–70 UCLA Bruins men's basketball team won its fourth consecutive NCAA National Basketball Championship, the sixth in seven years under head coach John Wooden, despite the departure of Lew Alcindor to the NBA, with a win over Jacksonville.

The team was honored forty years later in 2010, at halftime of the UCLA-Oregon game on February 27.

Players

Coaches
 Head Coach: John Wooden
 Assistants: Denny Crum and Gary Cunningham
 Athletic Trainer: Elvin C. "Ducky" Drake
 Head Student Manager: George Morgan

Schedule

|-
!colspan=9 style=|Regular Season

|-
!colspan=12 style="background:#;"| NCAA Tournament

Rankings

Notes
 Sidney Wicks was named to the 1970 All-America roster's second team.
 1970 – Sidney Wicks received national co-player of the year honors from the Helms Athletic Foundation
 At the conclusion of the season, the team collectively signed a letter to President Nixon condemning the Vietnam War and the administration's actions at home.
 The Bruin Classic was held on Dec. 27 and Dec. 29 with Georgia Tech and Princeton.
 In defeating LSU, UCLA forced Pete Maravich to commit 18 turnovers.

References

External links

1969–70 UCLA Bruins at Sports-Reference.com

Ucla Bruins
UCLA Bruins men's basketball seasons
NCAA Division I men's basketball tournament championship seasons
NCAA Division I men's basketball tournament Final Four seasons
Ucla
UCLA Br
UCLA